Alex Da Corte (born 1980) is an American conceptual artist who works in painting, sculpture, installation, and video. Da Corte often uses surreal imagery and everyday objects in his practice and explores ideas of consumerism, pop culture, mythology, and literature.

He has shown internationally at Bodega, Gió Marconi, Josh Lilley Gallery, Maccarone, Herning Museum of Contemporary Art, Massachusetts Museum of Contemporary Art, and Institute of Contemporary Art. Da Corte has worked on a number of collaborative projects with other visual artists, writers, and musicians including Jayson Musson, Dev Hynes, Sam Mckinniss, and Annie Clark. In February 2021, his works were selected for inclusion in the Metropolitan Museum of Art's roof garden collection.

Early life and education 
Da Corte was born in Camden, New Jersey, in 1980. He spent his formative years growing up in Venezuela. In 2001, he studied Film/Animation and Fine Arts at the School of Visual Arts in New York City and then went on to receive his BFA in Printmaking/Fine Arts, from The University of the Arts in Philadelphia in 2004. He graduated from Yale University with an MFA in 2010.

Work 
Since 2013, Alex Da Corte has mounted shows from New York commercial galleries like Luxembourg & Dayan to international museums like The Louisiana Museum of Modern Art in Denmark. In 2014, Da Corte had a solo exhibition at the White Cube Gallery in London titled "White Rain".

In 2015, Da Corte's solo show Die Hexe at Luxembourg & Dayan Gallery (NYC) was reviewed by art critic Roberta Smith of The New York Times. In a piece on the exhibition she wrote of Da Corte's previous work, "last year's show dazzled at every turn, weaving confounding narratives about innocence and decadence, mass production and eccentricity..."

In 2016, Da Corte's opus was the subject of an exhibition entitled Free Roses at Mass MOCA in North Adams, Massachusetts which is the largest of his career so far.

In the arena of hip hop, Da Corte directed the 2013 video for the track "Hush BB" by the rapper Le1f. He also contributed the cover art for the second studio album by the hip hop group Spank Rock 2013's "Everything Is Boring and Everyone Is a Fucking Liar".

In the recent past Da Corte has taken to taking on the persona of the rapper Eminem which was the crux of his solo exhibition "Bad Land" at the Josh Lilley gallery in London which ran from November 2017 until February 2018.

Da Corte's work is included in the 2019 58th edition of the Venice Biennale "May You Live in Interesting Times" curated by Ralph Rugoff and appears in both main sections with 57 Varieties in the arsenale and The Decorated Shed in the giardini.

In 2021 Da Corte was the recipient of the Metropolitan Museum of Art roof commission for which he created an adapted replica of an Alexander Calder mobile  upon  which is seated a bright blue facsimile representation of  the ambulatory avian Mupppet personality Big Bird. The sculpture is inspired by the work of the Italian writer Italo Calvino (1923-1985) and named for his story As Long as the Sun Lasts.

Collaborations 
Throughout Da Corte's career, he has collaborated with other artists, including Borna Sammak, Sean Fitzgerald, Jayson Musson and Dev Hynes. Da Corte's collaborative installation, Easternsports (2014), is two and a half hours of atmospheric video on four channels, and a disjointed essay-poem of tens of thousands of words running through the subtitles. The work was created with Jayson Musson and scored by Dev Hynes. After the completion of Easternsports Da Corte and Hynes worked together to create a video for GAP's "Play Your Stripes" campaign. Alex Da Corte's most recent collaboration opened on September 3, 2016 at the Herning Museum of Contemporary Art in Herning, Denmark. The exhibition titled, 50 Wigs showcases original sculptures by Da Corte alongside a collection of objects from Andy Warhol's personal estate. Working closely with the Andy Warhol Museum to bring the show to life, Da Corte "transforms Warhol's personal belongings to art objects"

In 2017, Da Corte directed the music video for the musician St. Vincent's song "New York". In 2018, the duo reunited for a second pairing, whereby the artist/director employed the artist/musician in another video this time as part his exhibition "C-A-T Spells Murder" at the Karma gallery in New York City (February 18 – March 18, 2018); where in an 11-minute video Da Corte shows St. Vincent holding a one eyed feline while the performer makes a series of facial expressions ending in terror while this film looped was played within an instillation which also featured an eleven foot high sculpture of a cat.

Selected exhibitions

Solo 
 The Death of All Things Beautiful, The University of The Arts, Philadelphia, PA, 2005
 Welcome Your Sorrows, Black Floor Gallery, Philadelphia, PA, 2005
 Help Yourself to Roses, Space 1026, Philadelphia, PA, 2006
 I Attach Myself to You, Stonefox Art Space, New York, NY, 2007
 I Think About You All The Time, Parisian Laundry, Montreal, Canada, 2007
 Casual Luxury, La Montagne Gallery, Boston, MA, 2009
 Activity #91, Golden Age, Chicago, IL, 2009
 The Kind of Dog that Keeps You Waiting, Yale Gallery, New Haven, CT, 2010
 The Island Beautiful/Mortal Mirror" Bodega/Extra Extra, Philadelphia, PA, 2011
 Night Chat, Galerie Olivier Robert, Paris, France, 2012
 Candy Rain, Joe Sheftel, New York, NY, 2012
 Magic Stick, Still House, New York, NY, 2012
 Gentle Pain, Mallorca Landings, Mallorca, Spain, 2012
 Dead Zone, Nudashank, Baltimore, MD, 2013
 CAR WHORE, Wake, Detroit, MI, 2013
 BACON BREAST, ARTSPEAK, Vancouver, Canada, 2013
 Fun Sponge, ICA at MECA, Portland, ME, 2013
 1 O O O I S L A N D, Joe Sheftl Gallery, New York, NY, 2013
 White Rain, White Cube, London, U.K., 2014
 Delirium I, David Risley Gallery, Copenhagen, Denmark, 2014
 A Night In Hell, Carl Koystál, Stockholm, Sweden, 2014
 Easternsports, with Jayson Musson, ICA, Philadelphia, PA, 2014
 Die Hexe, Luxembourg & Dayan, New York, NY, 2015
 Devil Town, Gio Marconi, Milan, Italy, 2015
 Le Miroir Vivant, Museum Boijmans Van Beuningen, Rotterdam, Netherlands, 2015
 A Season in He'll, Art + Practice, Los Angeles, CA, 2016
 A Man Full of Trouble, Maccarone Gallery, New York, NY, 2016
 Free Roses, Mass MoCA, North Adams, MA, 2017
 50 Wigs, Herning Museum of Contemporary Art, Herning, Denmark, 2017
 Slow Graffiti, Secession, Vienna, Austria, 2017
 BAD LAND, Josh Lilley Gallery, London, U.K. 2018
 C-A-T Spells Murder, Karma, New York, NY, 2018
 THE SUPERMAN, Kölnischer Kunstverein, Cologne, Germany, 2018
 Marigolds, Karma, New York, NY, 2019
Prada Rong Zhai (2020)
As Long as the Sun Lasts, New York, NY 2021

Group 
 Red, Gallery One, The University of The Arts, Philadelphia, PA, 2003
 Turning Pages, Whittier College, Whittier, CA, 2005
 Nexus Selects, Nexus Gallery, Philadelphia, PA, 2005
 Faux Naturel, The Warehouse Gallery, Syracuse, NY, 2006
 This Is This, ICA, Philadelphia, PA, 2008
 L'Autre, Rosenwald-Wolf Gallery, Philadelphia, PA, 2008
 2000 Years of Sculpture, Fleisher/Ollman Gallery, Philadelphia, PA, 2008
 Love Explosion, Fleisher/Ollman Gallery, Philadelphia, PA, 2008
 I Want a Little Sugar in My Bowl, Asia Song Society, New York, NY, 2008
 Between Spaces, PS1 MoMA, New York, NY, 2009
 Rich Text, Fleisher/Ollman Gallery, Philadelphia, PA, 2009
 Christmas in July, Yvon Lambert, New York, NY, 2010
 Cellar Door: Front Room Series, Contemporary Art Museum, St. Louis, MO, 2010
 SubStainability, Texas State University Gallery, San Marcos, TX, 2011
 ICA Open Video Call Exhibition, ICA, Philadelphia, PA, 2011
 New Skin for the Old Ceremony, Museum of Modern Art, New York, NY, 2011
 That's How We Escaped: Reflections on Warhol, ICA, Philadelphia, PA, 2011
 The Unlimited Plan (with Kate Levant), Cleopatra's, Brooklyn, NY, 2011
 Spirit of the Signal, Nicole Klagsbrun Gallery, New York, NY, 2011
 Re: Empire, TEAM Gallery, New York, N, 2011
 BLEACH, Jolie Laide Gallery, Philadelphia, PA, 2011
 First Among Equals, ICA, Philadelphia, PA, 2012
 Specifically Yours, Joe Sheftel Gallery, New York, NY, 2012
 New Skin for the Old Ceremony, Musée des Beaux-Arts, Montreal, Canada, 2012
 Painting Without Paint, David Risley Gallery, Copenhagen, Denmark, 2012
 As Is Wet Hoagie, OKO Gallery, New York, NY, 2013
 Body Without Organs With Sean Fitzgerald, Fjord, Philadelphia, PA, 2013
 Cardboard Lover, American Contemporary, New York, NY, 2014
 The New Beauty of Our Modern Life, Higher Pictures, New York, NY, 2014
 Border Food, Loyal, New York, NY, 2014
 Slip, Mitchell-Innes & Nash, New York, NY, 2014
 Taut Eye Tau, Musée d'art contemporain de Lyon, Lyon, 2015
 Bonsai #5, Maccarone, New York, NY, 2015
 Illumination, Louisiana Museum of Modern Art, Humlebaek, 2016
 The 5th of July, Atlanta Contemporary Art Center, Atlanta, GA, 2016
 Fire Under Snow, Louisiana Museum of Modern Art, Humlebaek, Denmark, 2016
 Pièces-Meublés, Patrick Seguin, Paris, France, 2016
 Wild Style: Exhibition of Figurative Art, Peres Projects, Berlin, Germany, 2016
 Illumination, Louisiana Museum of Modern Art, Humlebaek, Denmark, 2016
 Dreamlands: Immersive Film and Cinema Since 1905, The Whitney Museum of American Art, New York, NY, 2017
 Summer Show, Carl Kostyál, Stockholm, 2017
 Cells, Marianne Boesky Gallery, New York, NY, 2017
 Soft Focus, Reyes Projects, Birmingham, MI, 2018
 Collections, Musée d'art contemporain, Lyon, France, 2018
 Carnegie International, 57th Edition, Pittsburgh, Philadelphia, 2018

References 

Living people
1980 births
21st-century American artists
American conceptual artists
American music video directors
Artists from Philadelphia
People from Camden, New Jersey
School of Visual Arts alumni
University of the Arts (Philadelphia) alumni
Yale School of Art alumni